Yaña Yul is a rural locality (a posyolok) in Yuğarı Oslan District, Tatarstan. The population was 111 as of 2010.

Geography 
Yaña Yul, Verkhneuslonsky District is located 27 km south of Yuğarı Oslan, district's administrative centre, and 61 km southwest of Qazan, republic's capital, by road.

History 
The village was established in 1924.

Until 1927 was a part of Zöyä Canton; after the creation of districts in Tatar ASSR (Tatarstan) in Tämte (1927–1931), Yuğarı Oslan (1931–1963),  Yäşel Üzän (1963–1965) and Yuğarı Oslan districts.

References

External links 
 

Rural localities in Verkhneuslonsky District